Lewis Burwell Puller Jr. (August 18, 1945 – May 11, 1994) was an attorney and a United States Marine Corps officer who was severely wounded in the Vietnam War. He won the 1992 Pulitzer Prize for Biography or Autobiography for his autobiography Fortunate Son.

Life and career
Lewis Burwell Puller Jr. was the son of Lt. General Lewis "Chesty" Puller, the most decorated Marine in the history of the U.S. Marine Corps. He followed in his father's footsteps and became a Marine officer.

Puller was graduated from the Christchurch School, in Christchurch, Virginia, in 1963 and from the College of William and Mary in 1967. After his graduation from Officer Candidate School, he received orders to South Vietnam in July 1968, where he served as an Infantry Platoon Leader for three months. On October 11, 1968, his rifle jammed during an engagement with North Vietnamese troops; Puller was wounded when he tripped a booby-trapped howitzer round, losing his right leg at the hip, his left leg above the knee, his left hand and most of his fingers on his right hand in the explosion.

The shell riddled his body with shrapnel, and he lingered near death for days with his weight dropping to 55 pounds, but he survived. Puller later recalled the first time his father saw him in the hospital. He described how his father broke down weeping and that hurt him more than any of his physical injuries. Those who knew him say that it was primarily because of his iron will and his stubborn refusal to die that he survived. He was medically discharged from the Marine Corps. He was awarded the Silver Star Medal, the Navy and Marine Corps Commendation Medal, two Purple Heart Medals, and the Republic of Vietnam Gallantry Cross for his service in the Marine Corps.

For years after he returned to a reasonably sound physical condition, he remained emotionally shaken, though he earned a law degree, had two children with the woman he had married before going to Vietnam, and raised a family. He was admitted to the Virginia Bar in 1974 and began working as a lawyer for the Veteran's Administration and on President Gerald Ford's clemency board. He mounted a campaign for Congress in 1978 as a Democrat in Virginia but lost in a landslide with only 28% of the vote against incumbent Republican Congressman Paul Trible. Throughout the years, he battled periods of despondency and drank heavily until 1981, when he underwent treatment for alcoholism. Despite that treatment, Puller continued to suffer severe depression and occasional bouts of alcoholism.

Puller told the story of his ordeal and its aftermath in his 1991 autobiography, Fortunate Son: The Autobiography of Lewis B. Puller Jr., published by Grove Press.
The account ended with Puller triumphing over his physical disabilities and becoming emotionally at peace with himself. The following year he won the 1992 Pulitzer Prize for Biography or Autobiography. The title of this autobiography was borrowed from the song "Fortunate Son" by Creedence Clearwater Revival, to which he gives credit in the opening pages.

According to friends and associates, Puller spent the last months of his life in turmoil. He left his job as a lawyer at the Pentagon to accept a teaching position at George Mason University. In the days leading up to his death, Puller fought a losing battle with the alcoholism that he had kept at bay for 13 years, and struggled with a more recent addiction, to painkillers initially prescribed to dull continuing pain from his wounds.

Death and aftermath

Puller died from a self-inflicted gunshot on May 11, 1994. He was survived by his wife, Linda T. "Toddy" Puller, from whom he had separated in 1991. Puller's survivors included their two children, Lewis III and Maggie, his twin sister, Martha Downs, and sister, Virginia Dabney.

Puller's name is not listed on the Vietnam Veterans Memorial, which is reserved for those who died or who are listed as missing in action. However, his name is listed on the nearby In Memory Memorial Plaque, which represents those veterans, like Puller, who "died after their service in the Vietnam war, but as a direct result of that service, and whose names are not otherwise eligible for placement on the memorial wall."

Terry Anderson, a former Associated Press journalist, who was held hostage in Lebanon, recalled the same hope he had had for his friend, Puller. "This is a man who had so many burdens, so many things to bear. And he bore them well for 25 years," he said. "What did I miss?" Anderson asked. "I was his friend. I thought he was winning".

In a statement, Puller's wife, Toddy said, "Our family has been moved and humbled by the outpouring of affection for Lewis. The many acts of kindness from our friends across the country have helped us in this very difficult time. It is clear that Lewis affected the lives of people in ways that we never knew."  Of her deceased husband, she said, "To the list of names of victims of the Vietnam War, add the name of Lewis Puller ... He suffered terrible wounds that never really healed". In 1991, she was elected to the Virginia House of Delegates.

On Veterans Day 2010, the Lewis B. Puller Jr. Veterans Benefits Clinic at The College of William & Mary Law School was named in honor of Puller.

Awards 
During his military career, Puller earned the following:

References

External links
 
 

1945 births
1994 suicides
American amputees
Burials at Arlington National Cemetery
American military personnel who committed suicide
Pulitzer Prize for Biography or Autobiography winners
Suicides by firearm in Virginia
United States Marine Corps officers
United States Marine Corps personnel of the Vietnam War
College of William & Mary alumni
Recipients of the Silver Star
George Mason University faculty
Military personnel from North Carolina
Military personnel from Virginia
People from Jacksonville, North Carolina
Virginia lawyers
Writers from Virginia
People from Camp Lejeune, North Carolina
Recipients of the Gallantry Cross (Vietnam)
1994 deaths